The FIBA World Olympic Qualifying Tournament 2008 for women took place from June 9 to June 15, 2008. On December 9, 2007, FIBA announced that Spain would host the wildcard tournament.

Through this tournament, the final five qualifying berths for the 2008 Olympics women's basketball competition were captured by Spain, Belarus, Latvia, the Czech Republic, and Brazil. The 12 teams that competed in the 2008 FIBA World Olympic Qualifying Tournament were based on the finishes in each of FIBA’s five zone qualifying tournaments.

Participating nations 

The draw was made on January 14, 2008 in Institute of Training and Studies of the Central Government of Madrid.

The teams were divided into three pots, roughly corresponding to the FIBA World Rankings and to their continental zones (all European teams are in Pot 3):

Format 
The 12 participating teams were divided into four groups (A, B, C and D) of three teams each. Each team played all the other teams in its own group. The teams placed 1st and 2nd in each group played in the Quarter-Finals, with the four winners of the Quarter-Finals qualifying for the Olympic Games. The four losers played in the Semi-Finals and Finals for one remaining qualifying place.

Squads

Preliminary round

Times given below are in Central European Summer Time (UTC+2).

Group A

{{Basketballbox|bg=#eee |date=June 11|place=Madrid Arena, Madrid|time=15:00
|teamA=|scoreA=69
|teamB=|scoreB=83|Q1=19-20|Q2=18-21|Q3=24-17|Q4=8-25'}}

Group B

Group C

Group D

Knockout stageNote: Italicized teams qualify for the Olympics.''

Quarterfinals

Semifinals

Final game

References 
Official Website in English and Spanish
 Video of the Draw @ fiba.com

 
FIBA World Olympic Qualifying Tournament for Women
Qualifying Tournament
2007–08 in Spanish women's basketball
2008 in women's basketball
International women's basketball competitions hosted by Spain
Sports competitions in Madrid